The following list includes prisoner-of-war camps during World War II, both allied and axis:

Allied prisoner-of-war camps during World War II
List of World War II prisoner-of-war camps in Australia
List of World War II prisoner-of-war camps in Canada
List of World War II prisoner-of-war camps administered by France
List of prisoner-of-war camps in Allied-occupied Germany
List of World War II prisoner-of-war camps in Kenya
List of World War II prisoner-of-war camps in the Soviet Union
List of World War II prisoner-of-war camps in the United Kingdom
List of World War II prisoner-of-war camps in the United States

Axis prisoner-of-war camps during World War II
List of prisoner-of-war camps in Germany
List of Japanese-run internment camps during World War II
List of Japanese hell ships
List of World War II prisoner-of-war camps in Italy